Y Llethr is the highest mountain in the Rhinogydd range of Snowdonia, in north Wales. The summit consists of a flat grassy top marked only by a small cairn. The summit is more in keeping with its southern flanks than its rugged northern approach.

The shortest route to the summit goes from the valley of Cwm Nantcol in the west, either directly or via Bwlch Drws Ardudwy and over the mountain of Rhinog Fach. To the south lies  the mountain of Diffwys, to the south-east lies the mountain of Y Garn, to the north lies Rhinog Fach and to the west lies the hill of Moelfre.

References

Dyffryn Ardudwy
Ganllwyd
Llanbedr
Mountains and hills of Gwynedd
Mountains and hills of Snowdonia
Hewitts of Wales
Marilyns of Wales
Nuttalls